is the second live album by Japanese idol duo Pink Lady, released through Victor Entertainment on September 10, 1977. It was recorded live at the duo's first summer concert at Denen Coliseum on July 26, 1977.

The album peaked at No. 2 on Oricon's weekly albums chart and sold over 130,000 copies.

Track listing

Chart position

References

External links
 
 
 

1977 live albums
Pink Lady (band) live albums
Japanese-language live albums
Victor Entertainment live albums